Omar Teodoro Antonio Minaya y Sánchez (born November 10, 1958) is a Dominican baseball executive. He was the special assistant to the general manager of the New York Mets of Major League Baseball. He previously served as general manager for the Mets and the Montreal Expos.

Early life
Born in the Dominican Republic, he moved to Elmhurst, in Queens, New York City at the age of eight and grew up in Corona. Minaya starred as a baseball player at Newtown High School in Elmhurst.

Playing career
Minaya was drafted by the Oakland Athletics in the 14th Round (342nd overall) of the 1978 Major League Baseball Draft.  He had a short-lived career in the minor leagues as well as stints in leagues in both the Dominican Republic and Italy.

Front-office career

New York Mets
In the mid-1990s, Minaya left Texas and returned home to join the staff of the New York Mets, working his way to assistant general manager behind Steve Phillips and being partly responsible for that team's late-1990s success. Minaya became the first Hispanic to hold a general manager position in Major League Baseball when he left the Mets in early  to accept the general manager position with the Montréal Expos.

Montreal Expos
In 2002, Minaya was named vice president and general manager of the Montreal Expos, who had been taken over by the other 29 major league teams. This unusual ownership arrangement was reached after a failed contraction attempt and the purchase of the Florida Marlins by former Expos owner Jeffrey Loria. When he arrived, there were only six other employees in baseball operations; those who hadn't followed Loria to Miami had gone elsewhere.

With the fan base rapidly declining and speculation that the team would be relocated, Minaya was forced to work with limited financial resources. Despite these limitations, Minaya was aggressive in his attempt to make the Expos a contender. On June 27, he traded Cliff Lee (future Cy Young winner and 2-time All-Star), Grady Sizemore (future 3-time All-Star, 2-time Gold Glove winner, and Silver Slugger), Brandon Phillips (future All-Star and two time Gold Glove winner) and Lee Stevens to the Cleveland Indians for Bartolo Colón. On July 11, he acquired Cliff Floyd from the Marlins only to deal him to the Boston Red Sox for Sun-Woo Kim and a minor leaguer by the end of the month. The 2002 Expos ended up with an 83–79 record and second place in the National League East.

The  Expos finished with an identical 83–79 record and were very much in the wild card race when Minaya was denied permission to make the usual call-ups that MLB teams make in September.  This, combined with the departure of star Vladimir Guerrero after the season, cost the Expos what little goodwill they still had in Montreal. The Expos went 67–95 in 2004 amid reports that their future in Montreal would soon end. When it was announced that the Expos would relocate to Washington, D.C. for the 2005 season, Minaya learned that with the move would come a new front office and coaching position.

The half-season rental of Bartolo Colón made by Minaya made as general manager of the Expos is part of arguably one of the worst trades of the century, as it included the  AL Cy Young Award winner in Lee and future All-Stars Brandon Phillips and Grady Sizemore. Minaya also dealt away a number of other young players that went on to enjoy significant success upon reaching the major league level. These included:

 Jason Bay (2004 Rookie of the Year, All-Star in 2005, 2006, & 2009, Top 25 in MVP Voting 2005 & 2006)
 Carl Pavano (2004 All-Star and Cy Young Award candidate)
 Chris Young (2007 All-Star)

Return to the Mets
After the Mets continued to struggle at the conclusion of the 2004 season, Mets owner Fred Wilpon asked Minaya to become the team's general manager. In Minaya's first offseason he made two significant free agent signings, adding pitcher Pedro Martínez and outfielder Carlos Beltrán. Signing Martinez helped raise the awareness of the Mets in Latin America, leading Minaya to remark that Martinez was "a guy that makes the brand."

Minaya's work in the 2005 offseason would further shape the franchise, adding closer Billy Wagner, first baseman Carlos Delgado and veteran catcher Paul Lo Duca. He also strengthened the bench by adding utility infielder José Valentín, first baseman Julio Franco and outfielder Endy Chávez. Bullpen acquisitions included Chad Bradford, Jorge Julio, and Duaner Sánchez. Despite the veteran additions, Minaya was able to limit payroll by trading Mike Cameron to the San Diego Padres for Xavier Nady and Kris Benson to the Baltimore Orioles for Jorge Julio and John Maine.

In 2006 the Mets won the National League East by 12 games, finishing first with a National-League-best and Major League-tied 97 wins. During the season, Minaya fortified the team by making additional trades, acquiring Orlando Hernández (for Jorge Julio) and Óliver Pérez and Roberto Hernández (for Xavier Nady) and trading away second baseman Kazuo Matsui.

Minaya and the Mets were featured in the Sports Illustrated cover story for the June 18, 2007 issue. The article focused on Minaya's upbringing in the Dominican Republic and Queens, as well as his brief minor league playing career, his two years playing professional baseball in Tuscany, and time as an international scout in the Rangers' organization.

The Mets signed Moisés Alou to multiple lucrative contracts, but Alou was plagued with injuries during his Mets career. Minaya also traded away several young pitchers that many fans believe could have helped the Mets avert their historic breakdown at the end of the 2007 season.  In November 2006, Minaya sent Heath Bell and Royce Ring to the Padres for Ben Johnson and Jon Adkins. A few days later, he sent hard-throwing relievers Henry Owens and Matt Lindstrom to the Florida Marlins for lefties Jason Vargas and Adam Bostick. The following month, he traded starting pitcher Brian Bannister (son of former major league pitcher Floyd Bannister) to the Kansas City Royals for a live bullpen arm in Ambiorix Burgos.  The young pitchers dealt away by Minaya, most notably Bell and Lindstrom thrived with their new teams, overall the Mets netted little on those deals.

Minaya's biggest acquisition came on January 29, 2008, when he reached a tentative deal with the Minnesota Twins to send Carlos Gómez, Philip Humber, Kevin Mulvey, and Deolis Guerra to the Twins for ace pitcher Johan Santana. The trade became official after Santana was signed to a contract extension and passed a physical.  Gómez was the only one of these four players to have a significant major league career, primarily with the Brewers, after just two years with the Twins.  The next off-season, Minaya needed to address the bullpen.  On December 9, he signed closer Francisco Rodríguez to a three-year deal. Rodriguez had been coming off a major league record of 62 saves in the 2008 season.  Three days later, Minaya acquired J. J. Putz from the Mariners in a three-team deal. On January 5, 2010, Minaya signed outfielder Jason Bay to a four-year deal. (As Expos general manager, Minaya traded Bay to the Mets in 2002.)

He was fired from the New York Mets organization on October 4, 2010, along with Manager Jerry Manuel.

Willie Randolph firing
Minaya was subject to intense scrutiny and criticism from many in Major League Baseball and by the New York City media for his handling of the firing of Willie Randolph as the Mets manager. Many members of the media and fans criticized the timing of the decision, a day into a west coast road trip, and some referred to the late night episode as the Mets' "Midnight Massacre." He fired Randolph in Randolph's hotel room in California after Randolph finished managing the first game of the Mets series with the Los Angeles Angels of Anaheim, a game which they won, 9-6. Minaya also fired pitching coach Rick Peterson and first base coach Tom Nieto. Randolph was removed from his position with no media present and the decision came to light through a press release from Minaya at 3:12am EST (12:12am PDT); as such, many of the Mets team members were unaware that this had transpired and, upon being informed (not by Mets management, but by various team reporters and commentators) expressed shock and disbelief. Randolph's job was in question for the two to three weeks prior to the decision being made, and the uncertainty of Randolph's job had been more at the forefront of the questions surrounding the team than the actual baseball they had been playing.  Jerry Manuel, Randolph's bench coach, was appointed the interim manager of the Mets. Coaches Ken Oberkfell (new first base coach), Dan Warthen (new pitching coach), and Luis Aguayo (new third base coach) also joined the team after this decision (Sandy Alomar Sr. became Manuel's bench coach). During his 5pm EST press conference from California, Minaya confirmed that Manuel would remain as the Mets manager during the remainder of the 2008 season. On October 3, 2008, it was reported that Manuel had agreed to a two-year deal to remain Mets manager, with a club option for a third year.

Tony Bernazard firing
On July 27, 2009, the Mets organization issued a statement announcing the firing of Vice President of Development Tony Bernazard by Minaya saying, in part, "I spoke with Tony [Bernazard] this morning and informed him of my decision to terminate his employment with the Mets", confirming an earlier report.  At the press conference announcing the firing, Minaya angrily challenged the accuracy of past news reports, claiming that New York Daily News reporter Adam Rubin, who initially broke the story about Bernazard challenging Binghamton Mets players to a fight, was angling for a position in the Mets organization. This led to a heated exchange of words between the two, with Rubin calling Minaya "despicable." Shortly after the press conference, Minaya said that he stood by his comments about Rubin but acknowledged that it "was not the proper forum to raise those issues." Three days later, Minaya personally apologized to Rubin for his remarks.

San Diego Padres
On December 2, 2011, Minaya was hired by the San Diego Padres as senior vice president of baseball operations. Minaya left the position in January 2015 joining the Major League Baseball Players Association as a senior adviser to executive director Tony Clark.

Third Stint With The Mets
On December 22, 2017, Minaya was hired by the New York Mets as a Special Assistant to General Manager Sandy Alderson. After Sandy Alderson took a leave of absence from the Mets in July 2018 due to a recurrence of cancer. Alderson was informally succeeded on an interim basis by John Ricco, Minaya, and J. P. Ricciardi.

After Steve Cohen purchased the team on November 6, 2020, Minaya was dismissed two hours after.

Minaya was rehired once again by the Mets in January 2021 in an ambassadorship role while also helping to reach out to the Latino community.

On February 2, 2022, Minaya was hired by Major League Baseball to serve as a consultant for amateur scouting initiatives.

Personal life
While with the Mets, Minaya was a resident of Harrington Park, New Jersey, conducting team business at his home office there.

On January 6, 2009, President George W. Bush appointed Minaya to a position on his Council on Physical Fitness and Sports. Minaya's term lasted 16 months. As stated by mlb.com writer Anthony DiComo, "the council serves as a catalyst to promote health and fitness through participation in physical activity and sports."

His son, Justin Minaya, played basketball for the Providence Friars men's basketball team.

References

External links

1958 births
Living people
Dominican Republic businesspeople
People from Elmhurst, Queens
People from Corona, Queens
People from Harrington Park, New Jersey
Sportspeople from Queens, New York
Baseball players from New York City
Dominican Republic baseball players
Wausau Timbers players
Major League Baseball general managers
Newtown High School alumni
New York Mets executives
Montreal Expos executives
San Diego Padres executives
Texas Rangers scouts